Youtazi is a type of steamed multi-layer bread. It is eaten within the Xinjiang Uyghur Autonomous Region of China.

See also
Uyghur cuisine

References
Xinjiang Restaurant

Uyghur cuisine
Chinese breads